Apgah was an unincorporated community in Kanawha County, West Virginia, United States. Its post office  is closed.

References 

Unincorporated communities in West Virginia
Unincorporated communities in Kanawha County, West Virginia